Nova genera plantarum, commonly abbreviated as Nov. Gen. Pl.,  was a register of plants published from Uppsala by Thunberg from 1781 onwards, listing new genera. Contributing editors were  
Peter Ulrik Berg
Carl Fredrik Blumenberg
Nils Gustaf Bodin
Pehr Branström
Claës Fredrik Hornstedt, 1758–1809
Carl Fredrik Lexow
Johan Gustaf Lodin
Claus Erik Mellerborg
Carl Henrik Salberg
Andreas Gustaf Salmenius
Carl Fredrik Sjöbeck
Gustaf Erik Sörling
Gabriel Tobias Ström, 1770–1840
Erik Carl Trafvenfeldt
Conrad Wallenius
Samuel Wallner, 1778–1865 

Artists contributing illustrations:
Samuel Niclas Casström, 1763–1827
Claës Fredrik Hornstedt, 1758–1809

Many botanical publications started with the phrase "Nova genera plantarum.....".  Notable were the ones by Pier Antonio Micheli (1679–1737), Carl Magnus Dassaw (1719–1751), Heinrich Adolph Schrader (1767–1836), and Aimé Bonpland (1773–1868).

External links
"Nova genera plantarum"

References

Florae (publication)
Botany books